Coleophora lasiocharis is a moth of the family Coleophoridae. It is found in Turkestan,
Uzbekistan and Iran.

The larvae feed on Glycyrrhiza glabra. They feed on the shoots of their host plant.

References

lasiocharis
Moths described in 1931
Moths of Asia